The Nashik Municipal Corporation(NMC), is the governing body of the city of Nashik in the Indian state of Maharashtra. The municipal corporation consists of democratically elected members, is headed by a mayor and administers the city's infrastructure, public services and police. Members from the state's leading political parties such as the Nationalist Congress Party, Indian National Congress, Shiv Sena, Bhartiya Janata Party, Maharashtra Navnirman Sena and the Communist Party of India (Marxist) hold elected offices in the corporation. 
Nashik municipal corporation (NMC) is located in Nashik. Nashik Municipal Corporation has been formed with functions to improve the infrastructure of town.

Jurisdiction
The city comes under the Nashik District, Maharashtra. The Collector is in charge of property records and revenue collection for the Central government. Appointed by the State government, the Collector also function as the election officer and conducts general as well as state elections in the city. The Nashik City Police is the law enforcement agency in the city and answers to the Ministry of Home Affairs of the GoM. It is headed by a Police Commissioner, an Indian Police Service (IPS) officer.

Administration 

The NMC is headed by an IAS officer who serves as Commissioner, wielding executive power. A quinquennial election is held to elect corporators, who are responsible for basic civic infrastructure and enforcing duty. The Mayor, usually from the majority party, serves as head of the house.

Revenue sources 

The following are the Income sources for the corporation from the Central and State Government.

Revenue from taxes 
Following is the Tax related revenue for the corporation.

 Property tax.
 Profession tax.
 Entertainment tax.
 Grants from Central and State Government like Goods and Services Tax.
 Advertisement tax.

Revenue from non-tax sources 

Following is the Non Tax related revenue for the corporation.

 Water usage charges.
 Fees from Documentation services.
 Rent received from municipal property.
 Funds from municipal bonds.

Election results

2017 results 
Election 2017 results.

2012 results 
The results of Election 2012 are as follows.

List of Mayors of Nashik Municipal Corporation

List of Deputy Mayor

References 

 
Municipal corporations in Maharashtra
Nashik